The 2013 UST Growling Tigers men's basketball team represented University of Santo Tomas in the 76th season of the University Athletic Association of the Philippines. The men's basketball tournament for the school year 2013-2014 began on June 29, 2013 and the host school for the season was Adamson University.

The Tigers, who at one point in the season were at sixth place in the standings with a 4-5 record finished fourth at the end of the double round-robin eliminations with eight wins against six losses. They made it to the Finals for the second straight year after defeating the No. 1-ranked NU Bulldogs in a repeat of their Final Four match last year while having a twice-to-win disadvantage. UST made history by becoming the first fourth-seeded team in the UAAP to reach the Finals.

They lost to La Salle in the best-of-three championship series. The Tigers who were facing the Green Archers in the Finals for the first time since 1999, had snapped La Salle's nine-game winning streak in Game One by a single point at 73-72. The Archers went on to win the next two games for the title with Game Three going into overtime.

Cameroonian center Karim Abdul was selected to the Mythical team for the second straight year.

Roster

Depth chart

Roster changes

Subtractions

Additions

Recruiting class

Injuries 
The Growling Tigers' season was plagued with injuries. Team captain Jeric Teng was leading in statistical points early in the tournament before suffering a slight labral tear on his shoulder. The injury which required the aid of crutches sidelined him for five games. Teng returned in the second round but got injured again after playing just one game when he sustained a pulled hamstring. He was fully recovered in time for the playoffs and was able to play in all of the team's Final Four and championship games.

Aljon Mariano had played the whole season while nursing an ankle injury while Kevin Ferrer suffered a fractured cheek bone from an elbow hit during a game against the UE Red Warriors. The injury required the use of a protective mask during games and corrective eye glasses outside games for a period of two months.

Returning point guard Pipoy Marata and rookie Joco Macasaet both suffered ACL injuries, while Brian So who was also a rookie had a lateral collateral ligament stress. All three players did not finish the season.

Schedule and results

Preseason tournaments 

The Filoil Flying V Preseason Premier Cup games were aired on Studio 23.

UAAP games 

Elimination games were played in a double round-robin format. All games were aired on Studio 23 and Balls. The second and third games of the Finals series were aired on ABS-CBN and Balls.

Postseason tournament 

Notes

UAAP statistics

Eliminations 

|- bgcolor=#ffffdd
| Karim Abdul || 14 || 14 || style=|33.0 || 82 || 190 || 43.2% || 2 || 6 || 33.3% || 63 || 97 || 64.9% || style=|12.1 || 1.4 || style=|0.9 || style=|2.0 || 3.2 || style=|16.4
|-
| Aljon Mariano || 14 || 8 || 29.7 || 64 || 149 || 43.0% || 6 || 17 || style=|35.3% || 45 || 67 || 67.2% || 7.1 || 2.4 || 0.5 || 0.2 || 2.6 || 12.8
|- bgcolor=#ffffdd
| Jeric Teng || 7 || 7 || 27.4 || 30 || 90 || 33.3% || 4 || 26 || 15.4% || 19 || 24 || 79.2% || 4.3 || 1.7 || style=|0.9 || 0.0 || 1.6 || 11.9
|-
| Kevin Ferrer || 14 || 10 || 30.4 || 58 || 171 || 33.9% || 9 || 71 || 12.7% || 42 || 61 || 68.9% || 8.1 || 2.1 || 0.7 || 1.0 || 1.9 || 11.9
|- bgcolor=#ffffdd
| Ed Daquioag || 14 || 8 || 24.4 || 45 || 104 || style=|43.3% || 9 || 37 || 24.3% || 24 || 39 || 61.5% || 4.5 || style=|2.5 || 0.6 || 0.4 || 2.3 || 8.8
|-
| Tata Bautista || 14 || 8 || 28.5 || 38 || 130 || 29.2% || 23 || 79 || 29.1% || 15 || 19 || 78.9% || 3.8 || 1.6 || 0.4 || 0.0 || 1.7 || 8.1
|- bgcolor=#ffffdd
| Kim Lo || 14 || 6 || 17.6 || 17 || 55 || 30.9% || 2 || 13 || 15.4% || 10 || 15 || 66.7% || 2.9 || 1.1 || 0.8 || 0.2 || 0.9 || 3.3
|-
| Jon Sheriff || 8 || 1 || 12.5 || 5 || 16 || 31.3% || 0 || 0 || 0.0% || 6 || 10 || 60.0% || 2.8 || 1.5 || 0.3 || 0.0 || 0.1 || 2.0
|- bgcolor=#ffffdd
| Brian So || 6 || 2 || 5.5 || 2 || 8 || 25.0% || 0 || 2 || 0.0% || 3 || 4 || 75.0% || 0.8 || 0.0 || 0.0 || 0.0 || 0.3 || 1.2
|-
| Paolo Pe || 14 || 5 || 11.9 || 4 || 19 || 21.1% || 0 || 0 || 0.0% || 3 || 8 || 37.5% || 2.9 || 0.3 || 0.1 || 0.3 || 0.6 || 0.8
|- bgcolor=#ffffdd
| Robert Hainga || 8 || 1 || 4.4 || 3 || 7 || 42.9% || 0 || 0 || 0.0% || 0 || 1 || 0.0% || 0.5 || 0.1 || 0.0 || 0.0 || 0.0 || 0.8
|-
| Jeepy Faundo || 4 || 0 || 2.0 || 0 || 0 || 0.0% || 0 || 0 || 0.0% || 2 || 2 || style=|100.0% || 0.0 || 0.0 || 0.0 || 0.0 || 0.0 || 0.5
|- bgcolor=#ffffdd
| Kent Lao || 6 || 0 || 3.8 || 0 || 4 || 0.0% || 0 || 0 || 0.0% || 1 || 2 || 50.0% || 0.7 || 0.0 || 0.0 || 0.2 || 0.0 || 0.2
|-
| Joco Macasaet || 1 || 0 || 9.0 || 0 || 0 || 0.0% || 0 || 0 || 0.0% || 0 || 0 || 0.0% || 1.0 || 1.0 || 0.0 || 1.0 || 1.0 || 0.0
|- bgcolor=#ffffdd
| Pipoy Marata || 1 || 0 || 2.0 || 0 || 1 || 0.0% || 0 || 0 || 0.0% || 0 || 0 || 0.0% || 1.0 || 0.0 || 0.0 || 0.0 || 0.0 || 0.0
|-
| Robin Tan || 4 || 0 || 3.8 || 0 || 0 || 0.0% || 0 || 0 || 0.0% || 0 || 0 || 0.0% || 0.0 || 0.0 || 0.0 || 0.0 || 0.0 || 0.0
|- class=sortbottom
! Total || 14 ||  || 41.1 || 348 || 944 || 36.9% || 55 || 251 || 21.9% || 233 || 349 || 66.8% || 47.8 || 13.2 || 4.7 || 4.2 || 14.9 || 70.3
|- class=sortbottom
! Opponents || 14 ||  || 41.1 || 358 || 1,011 || 35.4% || 89 || 369 || 24.8% || 140 || 237 || 59.1% || 46.9 || 14.9 || 4.1 || 3.2 || 15.0 || 67.5
|}

Playoffs 

|- bgcolor=#ffffdd
| Jeric Teng || 5 || 5 || 32.0 || 35 || 84 || 41.7% || 10 || 25 || 40.0% || 16 || 21 || 76.2% || 5.2 || 2.2 || 0.2 || 0.0 || 1.8 || style=|19.2
|-
| Karim Abdul || 5 || 5 || 31.2 || 25 || 55 || 45.5% || 0 || 3 || 0.0% || 21 || 22 || 95.5% || style=|8.4 || 0.2 || style=|1.0 || style=|2.0 || 2.4 || 14.2
|- bgcolor=#ffffdd
| Kevin Ferrer || 5 || 5 || 30.6 || 17 || 48 || 35.4% || 13 || 32 || style=|40.6% || 18 || 25 || 72.0% || 5.6 || 1.2 || style=|1.0 || 0.4 || 1.8 || 13.0
|-
| Aljon Mariano || 5 || 4 || style=|34.0 || 12 || 51 || 23.5% || 0 || 7 || 0.0% || 14 || 22 || 63.6% || 8.0 || 1.6 || 0.6 || 0.2 || 3.2 || 7.6
|- bgcolor=#ffffdd
| Tata Bautista || 5 || 0 || 20.2 || 12 || 38 || 31.6% || 5 || 24 || 20.8% || 4 || 6 || 66.7% || 2.0 || 2.0 || 0.4 || 0.0 || 2.0 || 6.6
|-
| Jon Sheriff || 5 || 5 || 22.6 || 10 || 18 || style=|55.6% || 0 || 0 || 0.0% || 6 || 10 || 60.0% || 4.0 || style=|2.4 || 0.6 || 0.0 || 1.0 || 5.2
|- bgcolor=#ffffdd
| Ed Daquioag || 4 || 0 || 12.8 || 4 || 14 || 28.6% || 0 || 5 || 0.0% || 1 || 1 || style=|100.0% || 1.0 || 1.3 || 0.0 || 0.3 || 1.3 || 2.3
|-
| Kent Lao || 4 || 0 || 8.8 || 1 || 6 || 16.7% || 0 || 0 || 0.0% || 5 || 6 || 83.3% || 3.0 || 0.3 || 0.5 || 0.0 || 0.0 || 1.8
|- bgcolor=#ffffdd
| Paolo Pe || 5 || 1 || 11.4 || 3 || 7 || 42.9% || 0 || 0 || 0.0% || 2 || 4 || 50.0% || 3.8 || 0.0 || 0.0 || 0.2 || 0.6 || 1.6
|-
| Kim Lo || 4 || 0 || 7.0 || 1 || 4 || 25.0% || 0 || 1 || 0.0% || 4 || 4 || style=|100.0% || 2.0 || 0.0 || 0.3 || 0.0 || 1.3 || 1.5
|- bgcolor=#ffffdd
| Robert Hainga || 1 || 0 || 1.0 || 0 || 0 || 0.0% || 0 || 0 || 0.0% || 0 || 0 || 0.0% || 0.0 || 0.0 || 0.0 || 0.0 || 0.0 || 0.0
|- class=sortbottom
! Total || 5 ||  || 41.0 || 120 || 325 || 36.9% || 28 || 97 || 28.9% || 91 || 121 || 75.2% || 44.4 || 10.8 || 4.4 || 3.0 || 15.6 || 71.8
|- class=sortbottom
! Opponents || 5 ||  || 41.0 || 125 || 343 || 36.4% || 25 || 98 || 25.5% || 76 || 127 || 59.8% || 47.0 || 12.4 || 4.4 || 4.4 || 14.8 || 70.2
|}

Source: HumbleBola

Awards

Players drafted into the PBA

References 

UST Growling Tigers
UST Growling Tigers basketball team seasons